Daouda Bassock (born 13 March 1995) is a Cameroonian professional footballer who plays as a winger for French side Pouzauges Bocage.

Career
Bassock was signed by Niort in 2013 at the age of 18 from the ÉFCB football academy in Cameroon, whose former graduates include Samuel Eto'o and Rigobert Song. He spent the next two years in the reserves, where he was part of the team that won promotion to the Championnat de France amateur 2 in the 2014–15 season. On 27 May 2015, it was announced that Bassock, along with fellow reserve team players Jérémy Grain and Antoine Batisse, had signed his first professional contract with Niort.

Bassock made his senior debut in the 3–0 defeat at Dijon in Ligue 2 on 7 August 2015, playing the first 53 minutes before being replaced by Junior Sambia.

Career statistics

References

External links
 
 

1995 births
Living people
Cameroonian footballers
Footballers from Douala
Association football wingers
Ligue 2 players
Championnat National 3 players
Chamois Niortais F.C. players
Cameroonian expatriate footballers
Cameroonian expatriate sportspeople in France
Expatriate footballers in France